Crawford's Purchase is a township in Coös County, New Hampshire, United States. The purchase lies entirely within the White Mountain National Forest. As of the 2020 census, the purchase had a population of zero.

In New Hampshire, locations, grants, townships (which are different from towns), and purchases are unincorporated portions of a county which are not part of any town and have limited self-government (if any, as many are uninhabited).

History 

Geography 
None of it is covered by water, except for streams such as the Ammonoosuc River, which flows across the purchase from east to west.

Demographics 

As of the 2020 census, there were no people living in the purchase.

References

Townships in Coös County, New Hampshire
Berlin, New Hampshire micropolitan area
Townships in New Hampshire